The 2015–16 Manhattan Jaspers basketball team represented Manhattan College during the 2015–16 NCAA Division I men's basketball season. The Jaspers, led by fifth year head coach Steve Masiello, played their home games at Draddy Gymnasium and were members of the Metro Atlantic Athletic Conference. They finished the season 13–18, 9–11 in MAAC play to finish in sixth place. They defeated Marist in the first round of the MAAC tournament to advance to the quarterfinals where they lost to Siena.

Roster

Schedule

|-
!colspan=9 style=";"| Exhibition

|-
!colspan=9 style=";"| Regular season

 
 
 
 
 
 

|-
!colspan=9 style=";"| MAAC tournament

References

Manhattan Jaspers basketball seasons
Manhattan
Manhattan
Manhattan